John Erick Dowdle (born December 9, 1972) is an American film director and screenwriter, best known for horror films. He usually works with his brother Drew Dowdle as a producer and co-screenwriter.

Early life
Dowdle grew up in the Twin Cities of Minnesota. After graduating from the St. Thomas Academy, an all-boys, military, Catholic high school, Dowdle moved to Iowa City, Iowa to attend the University of Iowa where he joined the fraternity, Lambda Chi Alpha. He would then make the move from writing to film. Two years later, Dowdle moved to Manhattan, New York City to attend New York University's film program.

Career
After graduating from NYU, Dowdle moved to Los Angeles to pursue a career in filmmaking. Dowdle wrote and directed his first feature, the 1996 film Full Moon Rising, when he was just out of college. For his sophomore effort, The Dry Spell, Dowdle was joined by his younger brother Drew, who produced the film as John wrote, directed and edited. They now live in Los Angeles, working together as The Brothers Dowdle.

With his brother Drew Dowdle as a producer and/or co-screenwriter, John Erick Dowdle directed the horror films Quarantine, Devil, based on a storybook from M. Night Shyamalan, and As Above, So Below, as well as the 2015 thriller film No Escape, starring Owen Wilson and Pierce Brosnan.
 
He was announced to direct the movie adaption of Jack Kilburn's novel Afraid.

In 2017, Dowdle co-created the miniseries Waco with his brother, which aired on Paramount Network in 2018.

In March 2018, the Dowdle brothers announced they were developing a movie or basic cable presentation about newspaper columnist Dorothy Kilgallen, who died in 1965 under circumstances they contend were never satisfactorily resolved.

Personal life
Dowdle is married to Stacy Chbosky. Her brother, and therefore Dowdle's brother-in-law, is author and director Stephen Chbosky.

Filmography
Film

Television

References

External links
 

1973 births
Living people
American film directors
American male screenwriters
Horror film directors